Rajpal Singh Shekhawat 12 November 1962 born and birthplace is Pachar, Sikar. He is an Indian politician and current Member of the Rajasthan Legislative Assembly from Jhotwara in Jaipur. He was first inducted as Minister by Bhairon Singh Shekhawat and had a number of portfolios. Presently in Vasundhara Raje government, He is the Minister for Industries, Public enterprises, DMIC & NRI affairs He is a Leader of Bharatiya Janata Party.

References

External links
Rajpal Singh Shekhawat Member's Page - Rajasthan Legislative Assembly

1961 births
Bharatiya Janata Party politicians from Rajasthan
Living people
Politicians from Jaipur
State cabinet ministers of Rajasthan
Rajasthan MLAs 2013–2018